These are the official results of the Men's individual pursuit at the 1972 Summer Olympics in Munich, West Germany, held on 31 August and 1 September 1972. There were 28 participants from 28 nations.

Competition format

The individual pursuit competition consisted of a qualifying round and a 3-round knockout tournament, including a bronze medal race. Each race, in both the qualifying round and the knock-out rounds, consisted of a pair of cyclists starting from opposite sides of the track. The cyclists raced for 4,000 metres, attempting to finish with the fastest time and, if possible, catch the other cyclist. For the qualifying round, the eight fastest times overall (regardless of whether the cyclist finished first or second in his heat, though any cyclist who was overtaken was eliminated) earned advancement to the knockout rounds. In the knockout rounds, the winner of each heat advanced to the next round.

Results

Qualifying round

Quarterfinals

Quarterfinal 1

Quarterfinal 2

Quarterfinal 3

Quarterfinal 4

Semifinals

Semifinal 1

Semifinal 2

Finals

Bronze medal match

Final

Final classification

References

Cycling at the 1972 Summer Olympics
Cycling at the Summer Olympics – Men's individual pursuit
Track cycling at the 1972 Summer Olympics